Lucas Hägg-Johansson (born 11 July 1994) is a Swedish footballer who plays as a goalkeeper for Danish Superliga club Vejle Boldklub.

Career

Club career
Raised in Riseberga, Malmö, Hägg-Johansson started playing football as a young junior in Husie IF. At the age of 15, Lucas then joined FC Rosengård. In Rosengård, he trained with the first team under manager Mats Larsson. During 2011, Hägg-Johansson also sat on the bench in 11 games for Rosengård in the Swedish Division 1. At this time Hägg-Johansson had offers from among others Lunds BK and Malmö FF. 

However, In 2012, 17-year old Hägg-Johansson decided to join Kalmar FF. Here he had the opportunity to be the third goalkeeper behind Petter Wastå and Etrit Berisha. Yet to have get his debut for Kalmar, Hägg-Johansson spent the 2014 and 2015 seasons on loan at Oskarshamns AIK as part of a partnership between the two clubs, where he played in Division 1.

Returning to Kalmar FF, Hägg-Johansson made his debut in the Swedish top-tier, Allsvenskan, on 14 August 2016 when he was given a chance in the 1-1 match against Malmö FF. From the 2017 season and onwards, Hägg-Johansson established himself as the starting goalkeeper, playing 25 league games throughout the season and 30 in the 2018 season. After two slightly less good seasons - when he was even dropped from the team for a few matches in the 2021 season - it was confirmed on 4 January 2022, that Hägg-Johansson had left the club.

On 12 January 2022, Hägg-Johansson joined Danish Superliga club Vejle Boldklub.

References

External links 
 

1994 births
Living people
Swedish footballers
Swedish expatriate footballers
Association football goalkeepers
Kalmar FF players
Oskarshamns AIK players
Vejle Boldklub players
Allsvenskan players
Ettan Fotboll players
Danish Superliga players
Swedish expatriate sportspeople in Denmark
Expatriate men's footballers in Denmark